Joseph Olayeni Oni (born 5 July 1938) was the military governor of Niger State, Nigeria from July 1978 to October 1979 during the military regime of General Olusegun Obasanjo.
Oni replaced Navy Commander Okoh Ebitu Ukiwe.
He established a budget of N157 million for 1979, of which N76 million was devoted to capital expenditure.

Promoted to Brigadier, Oni was commander of the 1st Division from 9 January 1984 to 16 September 1985.
As Brigadier General, Oni was commander of the Headquarters Training and Doctrine Command, Nigerian Army, Minna from 15 September  1986 to 31 December 1987.

References

Living people
1938 births
Nigerian Army officers
Governors of Niger State